Located in the historic district of Cumberland, Maryland, the Washington Street Library first opened its doors on June 19, 1934.  This Greek Revival style building was constructed between 1849 and 1850, as a larger building for the Allegany County Academy, the first public school in Allegany County which was founded in 1799.  A new addition was constructed in 1966, allowing for the expansion of the library collection.

Today, the Washington Street Library houses the largest reference collection in the Allegany County Library System, and offers an extensive local history area in the Maryland Room.  Free internet access, books on tape, Interlibrary Loan services, and an impressive collection of fiction and non-fiction materials are just a few of the services offered.  Children's programs take place weekly.

References

External links
Allegany County Library System 

Libraries in Maryland
1934 establishments in Maryland
Buildings and structures in Cumberland, Maryland
Libraries established in 1934